Langham is a village and civil parish in the Mid Suffolk district of Suffolk in eastern England. Located around seven miles north east of Bury St Edmunds, in 2005 its population was 90. The parish also contains the hamlet of Stock Hill.

References

External links

Villages in Suffolk
Civil parishes in Suffolk
Mid Suffolk District